Gerrit Schouten (16 January 1779 – 28 January 1839) was a Surinamese artist, who has become famous for his painted papier-maché dioramas of Surinamese life. 

Schouten was born in  Paramaribo, the capital of Surinam, then a Dutch colony. The son of Hendrik Schouten, a Dutch government clerk,  and Suzanna Hanssen, a local black woman, he was an autodidact and taught himself how to paint. Schouten was the first Creole working as a professional artist. In 1835, he offered a butterfly painting to William, Prince of Orange during his visit to Suriname. Later he was awarded a gold medal by the House of Orange for his artwork.

References

Literature

External links

ANDA Suriname – Gerrit Schouten

Surinamese artists
Surinamese people of Dutch descent
1779 births
1839 deaths
People from Paramaribo